Twink is gay slang for a gay man who is usually (but not always) in his late teens to twenties whose traits may include a slim to average physique, a youthful appearance that may belie an older age, having little or no body hair, flamboyancy, and general physical attractiveness. Twink is used both as a neutral descriptor, which can be contrasted with bear, and as a pejorative. The term is often modified by various descriptors (e.g. femme twink, Euro twink, muscle twink) and is commonly used in the gay pornography industry.

Etymology
The exact origins of the term twink are disputed. Some trace its first appearance to 1963, although it may be derived from an older British gay slang term twank, which means: "The quarry of a homosexual prostitute (male); a man willing and ready to become any dominant man's 'partner'. Oxford Dictionaries claims twink has origins in the 1970s.

Another possible origin of the term may be a derivation from the American snack cake Twinkie, commonly regarded as the quintessential junk food. The food is described as "little nutritional value, sweet to the taste, and creme-filled"; by comparison, the young men are described as "short, and blond, and full of creme", with creme being a euphemism for semen. 

A backronym has been constructed for twink, according to which it stands for "'teenaged, white, into no kink", although these specified traits are not universally accepted as either necessary or sufficient to classify an individual as a "twink".

Usage

Popular culture 
In his book, Never Enough (2007), about a murder committed in 2003 in Hong Kong, described by the New York Times Book Review as hard-boiled clichés with a cartoonish first impression, Joe McGinniss describes a court case in which twink was defined as "a gay slang term used to denote an attractive, boyish-looking gay man between the ages of 18 and 23, slender ectomorph and with little or no body hair, often blond, often but not necessarily Caucasian."

Essayist Zeb J. Tortorici notes that gay twink porn thrives on the production and performance of "consumable and visually/anally receptive masculinity." A twink is "memorable for his outer packaging", not his "inner depth". Twink can be seen as a popular subgenre in gay porn widely consumed across the globe.

The term also serves to identify a subculture within gay culture for which members of the community may self-identify, but their stable assurance mostly comes from acceptance by other members. The subculture, as examined now, serves as a purely physical marker for attributes any one person may hold and/or acquire, highly dependent on normative society's take on beauty standards as a whole and what the community puts forth and prescribes to.

Grindr, a popular dating app for gay men, also utilizes the slang, in reference to "tribes" for users to "identify themselves with a niche group and filter their search to help find their type of guy."

Twink code
Like other "codes", such as the bear code, the twink code is a set of symbols using letters, numerals, and other characters commonly found on modern, Western computer keyboards, and used for the describing and rating of twinks. These codes are used in email, Usenet, and Internet forum postings to identify the physical type and preferences of the poster, but have mostly fallen out of usage. The code includes: physical traits, such as "c" for color of hair (from blond to black); "l" for length of hair (from bald/clean-shaven to very long); "h" for degree of hairlessness; "y" for youthful appearance; and "e" for "endowment" (penis size); as well as personality traits, such as "q" for "queeniness"; and sexual preferences, such as "k" for "the kinky factor".

Criticism 
The term twink has been accused of relying on "ageist and racist tropes of youth and white desirability" by Susan Driver. In regards to the term, Driver's epistemology finds that it is "a young, white, and performed masculinity that can be fetishized, consumed, ... clearly coded in terms of race and age: White, young", thus establishing the intersection for which race and age come together to create a hyper-sexualized denomination, often associated with sexual acts and the pornographic industry.

See also

References

Further reading

External links

 
 

English words
Gay effeminacy
Gay male pornography
LGBT slang
LGBT youth
LGBT-related slurs
Physical attractiveness
Pornography terminology
Stereotypes of LGBT people